The plant genus Trichosia is nowadays considered a synonym of Eria.

Trichosia is a genus of fungus gnats that feed on decaying organic matter and fungi.

Systematics and selected species
Subgenus Baeosciara Tuomikoski, 1966
T. scotica (Edwards, 1925)
Subgenus Mouffetina Frey, 1942
T. pulchricornis (Edwards, 1925)
Subgenus Trichosia Winnertz, 1867
T. basdeni Freeman, 1983
T. confusa Menzel & Mohrig, 1997
T. glabra (Meigen, 1830)
T. jenkinsoni Freeman, 1987
T. morio (Fabricius, 1794)
T. splendens Winnertz, 1867

Sciaridae
Sciaroidea genera